This is a list of flags used by Princely states before and during British rule in India:

Andaman and Nicobar Islands

Andhra Pradesh

Chhattisgarh

Gujarat

Haryana

Himachal Pradesh

Jammu and Kashmir and Ladakh

Jharkhand

Karnataka

Kerala

Madhya Pradesh

Maharashtra

Manipur

Orissa

Punjab

Rajasthan

Sikkim

Tamil Nadu

Telangana

Tripura

Uttarakhand

Uttar Pradesh

West Bengal

See also
Flag of India
List of Indian flags
List of princely states of British India (alphabetical)
List of princely states of British India (by region)

References

India
 
Flags